Voluntary death may refer to:

 Suicide, intentionally causing one's own death
 Voluntary euthanasia, ending a life painlessly
 Death by misadventure, death caused by a risk taken voluntarily
 Voluntary manslaughter, death caused in the heat of passion